The Central District of Shiraz County is a district (bakhsh) in Shiraz County, Fars Province, Iran. At the 2006 census, its population was 1,442,842, in 372,838 families.  There are two cities in the district: Shiraz and Darian. The district has six rural districts (dehestan): Bid Zard Rural District, Darian Rural District, Derak Rural District, Kaftarak Rural District, Qarah Bagh Rural District, and Siyakh Darengun Rural District.

References 

Shiraz County
Districts of Fars Province